"I Don't Know" is a song by Honeyz. The single was originally intended to be the lead single from the group's second studio album, Harmony, although the album was later cancelled. The single later featured on the group's 2006 compilation album The Collection. "I Don't Know" peaked at number 28 on the UK Singles Chart and number 11 on the UK R&B Chart in 2001. The song contains vocals from former member Mariama Goodman, though released after her departure from the group.

Track listing
UK Part I
"I Don't Know" (radio edit)
"I Don't Know" (Almighty Mix)
"Why You Wanna Lie on Me?"
"I Don't Know" (video)
 Enhanced CD includes "I Don't Know" video
 
UK Part II
"I Don't Know" (radio edit)
"In the Street" (2001 Mix)
"I Don't Know" (Sound Mindz Mix)
 Included poster
 
UK Promo
"I Don't Know" (radio edit)
 
UK 12" promo
"I Don't Know" (Almighty Mix)
"I Don't Know" (Sleazesisters Anthem Mix)
"I Don't Know" (Sound Mindz Mix)

UK promo CD
"I Don't Know" (Almighty Mix)
"I Don't Know" (Sleazesisters Mix)
"I Don't Know" (Sound Mindz Mix)

Credits and personnel 
Credits adapted from Discogs and YouTube.

 Steve Roberson – production
 The Collective – additional production
 Paul Meehan – production
 James Loughrey – percussion
 Mark Linderman – guitar
 Celena Cherry – vocals
 Naima Belkhiati – vocals
 Mariama Goodman – vocals
 Alex Cantrall – writing
 Joe Priollo – writing
 Chuck Giscomb – writing
 Shaunna Bolton – writing

Charts

References

2000 songs
Honeyz songs
Contemporary R&B ballads
2001 singles
Mercury Records singles
2000s ballads